Jiaodaluo or Foot Treadle Flour Sifter were foot-operated pedal implements that were used to sift flour in China. The foot treadle flour sifter had long been in use in China. An illustration of the machine is depicted in Song Yingxing's encyclopedia Tiangong Kaiwu written in 1637.

References

Agricultural machinery
Chinese inventions
Material-handling equipment
Solid-solid separation